Boris Becker defeated the defending champion Guy Forget in the final, 7–6(7–3), 6–3, 3–6, 6–3 to win the singles tennis title at the 1992 Paris Open.

Seeds
A champion seed is indicated in bold text while text in italics indicates the round in which that seed was eliminated.

  Jim Courier (quarterfinals)
  Pete Sampras (second round)
  Stefan Edberg (quarterfinals)
  Michael Chang (second round)
  Petr Korda (second round)
  Goran Ivanišević (semifinals)
  Andre Agassi (second round)
  Wayne Ferreira (second round)
  Boris Becker (champion)
  MaliVai Washington (second round)
  Guy Forget (final)
  Richard Krajicek (third round)
  Carlos Costa (second round)
  Alexander Volkov (third round)
  Sergi Bruguera (second round)
  Michael Stich (third round)

Draw

 ''NB: The Final was the best of 5 sets.

Finals

Top half

Section 1

Section 2

Bottom half

Section 3

Section 4

External links
 1992 Paris Open draw

Singles